Paramvir "Parm" Bains is a Canadian politician who defeated incumbent Kenny Chiu in the riding of Steveston—Richmond East as a member of the Liberal Party of Canada in the 2021 Canadian federal election.

Prior to his election, Bains was an instructor at Kwantlen Polytechnic University. Previously, he was a media and public relations officer with the provincial government. He ran for Richmond City Council in the 2018 British Columbia municipal elections. He is originally from Victoria, British Columbia. He is married and has two children.

Prior to the 2021 Campaign Bains attended a controversial rally which broke COVID regulations and where a political organizer was found dead under suspicious circumstances. Bains is also alleged to have benefited from Chinese government misinformation efforts against Conservative Kenny Chiu, which ultimately helped Bains win. He has faced ongoing criticism for his close relationship with Chinese government affiliated individuals.

Electoral history

Federal elections

Municipal elections 
Top 8 candidates elected — Incumbents marked with "(X)". Elected members' names are in bold

References

External links

Living people
Academic staff of the Kwantlen Polytechnic University
Liberal Party of Canada MPs
Members of the House of Commons of Canada from British Columbia
People from Richmond, British Columbia
Politicians from Victoria, British Columbia
21st-century Canadian politicians
Year of birth missing (living people)